The Mulford Act was a 1967 California bill that prohibited public carrying of loaded firearms without a permit. 
Named after Republican assemblyman Don Mulford, and signed into law by governor of California Ronald Reagan, the bill was crafted with the goal of disarming members of the Black Panther Party who were conducting armed patrols of Oakland neighborhoods, in what would later be termed copwatching. They garnered national attention after Black Panthers members, bearing arms, marched upon the California State Capitol to protest the bill.

Assembly Bill 1591 was introduced by Don Mulford (R) from Oakland on April 5, 1967, and subsequently co-sponsored by John T. Knox (D) from Richmond, Walter J. Karabian (D) from Monterey Park, Frank Murphy Jr. (R) from Santa Cruz, Alan Sieroty (D) from Los Angeles, and William M. Ketchum (R) from Bakersfield. A.B 1591 was made an “urgency statute” under Article IV, §8(d) of the Constitution of California after “an organized band of men armed with loaded firearms [...] entered the Capitol” on May 2, 1967; as such, it required a 2/3 majority in each house. On June 8, before the third reading in the Assembly (controlled by Democrats, 42:38), the urgency clause was adopted, and the bill was then read and passed. It passed the Senate (split, 20:20) on July 26, 29 votes to 7, and was signed by Governor Ronald Reagan on July 28, 1967.

Both Republicans and Democrats in California supported increased gun control, as did the National Rifle Association of America. Governor Ronald Reagan, who was coincidentally present on the capitol lawn when the protesters arrived, later commented that he saw "no reason why on the street today a citizen should be carrying loaded weapons" and that guns were a "ridiculous way to solve problems that have to be solved among people of good will." In a later press conference, Reagan added that the Mulford Act "would work no hardship on the honest citizen."

The bill was signed by Reagan and became California penal code nr.25850 and nr.171c.

See also

 Black Panther Party

References

Further reading

California statutes
United States firearms law
1967 in law
1967 in California